Ernest & Celestine is a 2012 animated comedy drama film directed by Stéphane Aubier, Vincent Patar and Benjamin Renner. The film is based on a series of children's books of the same name published by the Belgian author and illustrator Gabrielle Vincent. The film was selected to be screened in the Directors' Fortnight section at the 2012 Cannes Film Festival, as part of the TIFF Kids programme at the 2012 Toronto International Film Festival and at the 2013 Hong Kong International Film Festival. 

It was selected for the grand competition at feature film edition of the 2013 World festival of animated film Animafest Zagreb and was screened as the opening film. The film was released in the United States in 2013 by GKIDS. There is also an English dub that was released on 28 February 2014, with the voices of Forest Whitaker, Mackenzie Foy, Lauren Bacall, Paul Giamatti, William H. Macy, Megan Mullally, Nick Offerman and Jeffrey Wright. The film received widespread critical acclaim, and became the first animated film to win the Magritte Award for Best Film. It was nominated for Best Animated Feature at the 86th Academy Awards, but it lost to Walt Disney Animation Studios' Frozen.

A sequel, entitled Ernest & Celestine 2: A Trip to Gibberitia, was released in France on December 14, 2022.

Plot
Celestine is a young mouse who lives in the underground world of rodents. At the orphanage where she lives, the caretaker known as the Gray One tells scary stories about the evil nature of the bears that live in the outside world, though Celestine doubts that they are entirely true. She loves to draw but must soon study dentistry, since that's what all rodents do, and to prepare, she must travel above ground to collect the lost teeth of bear cubs from underneath pillows. On one such occasion, the cub's family catches Celestine in the act and chases her into a trash can where she is trapped and spends the night. The next morning, a destitute and starving bear named Ernest discovers Celestine and attempts to eat her.  Celestine convinces him to let her go by helping him break into the basement of a candy shop, where he can eat his fill.  He is soon caught by the store's owner, however, and arrested.  Celestine, who is behind on her quota of collected teeth, agrees to free him from the police wagon if he will help her break into and rob the teeth from the office of the store owner's wife, who happens to be a dentist.

Although the robbery initially seems successful, the pair soon find themselves being pursued by the police forces of both the mouse and bear cities.  They manage to evade capture by stealing a van, and escape to Ernest's remote cabin.  Ernest is initially reluctant to allow Celestine to stay with him, but they begin to bond after he discovers her love of art.  He reveals to her that his current destitution is a result of his rejection of his family's plan for him to go into law, like his ancestors, due to his desire to become an entertainer.  The two spend the winter happily together, though their joy is somewhat dampened by the constant radio broadcasts declaring that both police forces are still searching for them as well as how civil unrest has become rampant around both of their homes with the once submissive and complacent poor now rising up against their upper class oppressors.

In the Spring, the police are able to track the stolen van to the cabin.  Ernest is arrested by the mice, while Celestine is arrested by the bears.  Both are simultaneously put on trial, in the main floor and basement of the same courthouse. Though each of them protest their unfair treatment along with the government's bias and prejudice, as well as refusing to sell out their respective companion, the furious judges refuse to listen. Ernest and Celestine then call the judges and the rest of the higher class out on their cruelty to the lower class common folk. During the proceedings, a fire is accidentally started in the courthouse, and while the rest of the citizens flee despite the furious judges' demands to stay, Ernest and Celestine each stay behind to rescue their respective judges. The judges are both humiliated and broken that their people, the ones they thought they could always rule, have abandoned them to save their own lives while the ones they sought to wrongfully punish are their saviors. Having truly admitted defeat in their own hearts, the shameful judges drop the charges against them and have no other choice then to grant their wish to be able to remain living together. All the while, the judges express their inability to comprehend the concept of unconditional bonds; and can only watch along with the shaken populace of each place as the courthouses burn to the ground.

Reunited in Ernest's cabin, the pair decide to write and illustrate a book, telling the story of their friendship, though with some embellishments after Celestine protests including the part of their meeting where Ernest attempted to eat her.

Cast

Release
The film premiered at the 2012 Cannes Film Festival on 23 May 2012 and was theatrically released on 12 December 2012 by StudioCanal. It was also released on DVD on 16 April 2013 by StudioCanal.

Critical reception
Ernest & Celestine received acclaim from critics. The film review aggregator Rotten Tomatoes reports a 98% approval rating, based on 81 reviews with an average score of 8.20/10; the general consensus states: "Sweet and visually charming, Ernest & Celestine offers old-fashioned delights for animation lovers of all ages." Metacritic assigns a score of 86 based on 22 critics, indicating "universal acclaim." Andrew Chan of the Film Critics Circle of Australia writes, "The result is a human story of two unlikely allies, a mouse living in harmony and befriending a bear. It is essentially that simple and it works just fine." Writing on Roger Ebert's website, Glenn Kenny of MSN awarded the film 3½ stars out of 4, praising it for its positive messages of friendship. Kenny wrote: "Ernest and Celestine is the coziest movie you'll likely see all year. Every frame is suffused with a fireplace kind of warmth that, for me at least, cast an immediate spell that didn't let up."

Accolades
In June 2013, the film won the Award of the Hungarian National Student Jury at the 8th Festival of European Animated Feature Films and TV Specials.

Sequel
In February 2022, StudioCanal announced that a sequel entitled Ernest & Celestine 2: A Trip to Gibberitia was in production, to be released on December 14, 2022. The film was directed by Julien Chheng and Jean-Christophe Roger.

References

External links
 
 
 

2012 films
2012 animated films
2012 comedy-drama films
2010s French animated films
2010s children's animated films
Animated comedy films
Animated drama films
Animated films about bears
Animated films about mice
Animated films about orphans
Belgian animated films
Belgian comedy-drama films
Children's comedy-drama films
Flash animated films
French comedy-drama films
2010s French-language films
Magritte Award winners
StudioCanal films
Animated films about rats